Compsus canescens is a species of broad-nosed weevils in the family Curculionidae. This species is endemic to Colombia, commonly found in Bogotá and surrounding areas.

Taxonomy 
Compsus canescens was described for the first time by Carl Henrik Boheman in 1840, page 181, under the genus Platyomus. It belongs to the subfamily Entiminae, tribe Eustylini.

The holotype for Compsus canescens is housed at the Swedish Museum of Natural History (NHRS-JLKB000022893).

Description 
The original diagnosis, in Latin, offered by Boheman is as follows:

According to this diagnosis, the species can be recognized by the following features: briefly setulose, grey/silver dorsal scales; pronotum depressed medially, coarsely rugose, with lateral longitudinal elevations; elytra dorsally flattened, with moderately marked elytral punctures, with alternate interstriae elevated, apices briefly projected.

Distribution 
Oxyderces viridipes is endemic to Colombia. The type locality is 'Nova Granata' and there are plenty of records in iNaturalist from Bogotá and surrounding municipalities.

References 

Entiminae

Beetles of South America
Endemic fauna of Colombia
Beetles described in 1840